Eberhard Panitz (16 April 1932 – 1 October 2021) was a German writer, screenwriter, literary editor and publicist. He wrote epic works, documentaries, audio plays and scripts for films and television. He was committed to socialist realism, and received several awards in the German Democratic Republic (GDR). After German reunification, he continued to write for leftist publishers.

Life 

Panitz was born in Dresden, the son of a tram conductor and a saleswoman. He grew up in Dresden-Trachau. After working in a youth brigade building the Cranzahl Dam, he studied pedagogy and German studies at the University of Leipzig until 1953. He joined the Deutscher Schriftstellerverband in 1958, remaining a member until it was dissolved in 1990. He belonged to its executive board, and was vice president of its Berlin section.

Working as a freelance writer from 1959, Panitz wrote epic works, documentaries, audio plays and scripts for films and television, committed to socialist realism. His topics included building a socialist society, espionage, the bombing of Dresden and the emancipation of women. Novels such as Meines Vaters Straßenbahn (My father's tram) have autographic elements, set in Dresden. He created strong determined women characters. His novel Die unheilige Sophia (The unholy Sophia) is based on Sonja, a controversial mayor of Kolberg after World War II. The book was filmed, directed by Manfred Wekwerth, at original locations. Panitz was editor for two volumes of notable German stories (Erzählungen).

Panitz travelled frequently in socialist countries such as Vietnam, Cuba and Mongolia, resulting in books such as Gesichter Vietnams (Faces of Vietnam, 1978) and Cuba mi Amor (2004). He also travelled in the U.S. for several months. Panitz was a member of the Marxist forum of the Die Linke party.

After German reunification, his writings were released through small publishing houses dedicated to leftist topics. His 1982 novel Eiszeit, a warning of atomic weapons, was reprinted in 2016. He lived in Berlin-Grünau as a freelance writer.

Panitz died in Berlin at age 89.

Awards 

 1956 Jugendbuchpreis of the GDR
 1967 Erich Weinert Medal
 1971 Heinrich Greif Prize
 1973 Literature Prize of the Democratic Women's League of Germany
 1975 Heinrich Mann Prize
 1976 Heinrich Greif Prize
 1977 Nationalpreis der DDR
 1982  of East Berlin
 1984  of the Free German Trade Union Federation
 1985 Vaterländischer Verdienstorden of the GDR

Work

Books 

 Käte. Berlin 1955.
 In drei Teufels Namen. Berlin 1958.
 Flucht. Berlin 1956.

 Die Feuer sinken. Berlin 1960, Schkeuditz 2000 
 Das Mädchen Simra. Halle 1961.
 Das Gesicht einer Mutter. Halle 1962.
 Cristobal und die Insel Berlin 1963.

 Der siebente Sommer. Halle 1967
 Unter den Bäumen regnet es zweimal. Halle 1969
 Die sieben Affären der Doña Juanita. Halle 1972
 Der Weg zum Rio Grande. Berlin 1973.
 Die unheilige Sophia. Halle 1974, 2007 .
 Absage an Viktoria. Halle (Saale) 1975.

 Gesichter Vietnams. Berlin 1978 (Photos: Thomas Billhardt)
 Meines Vaters Straßenbahn. Halle 1979, Dresden 1996
 Die verlorene Tochter. Halle (Saale) 1979.
 Mein lieber Onkel Hans. Halle 1982
 Eiszeit. Halle (Saale) 1983

 Leben für Leben. Halle 1987
 Das Lächeln des Herrn O. Berlin 1994.

 Comandante Che, Berlin 1997.

 Cuba, mi amor. Berlin 2004.
 Der geheime Rotbannerorden. Böklund 2006, .
 Dresdner Novelle 1989. verlag am park in der edition ost, Berlin 2009, .

 Geheimtreff Banbury – Wie die Atombombe zu den Russen kam. 2nd edition. Das Neue Berlin, Berlin 2009, .
 Tagebuch der totgesagten Dichter. verlag am park in der edition ost, Berlin 2013, 
 Das Trümmerhaus der Träume. verlag am park in der edition ost, Berlin 2015, 
 Frau im Dämmerlicht. verlag am park in der edition ost, Berlin 2016, .
 Eiszeit. Eine unwirkliche Geschichte, revised 2016, Verlag Wiljo Heinen, Berlin/Böklund 2016, .

Filmography 
Panitz worked for films, sometimes writing the literary base, sometimes also the script. Films included:
 1967: , literary base

 1970: Netzwerk, scenario with director Ralf Kirsten
 1972: Der Dritte (Her Third), literary basis, director: Egon Günther
 1972/73:  (television film in four episodes based on his novel)
 1974/75: Die unheilige Sophia, literary base, script with Manfred Wekwerth, director: Wekwerth
 1976: Absage an Viktoria, literary base, script, director: 
 1980: Meines Vaters Straßenbahn, literary base, script, director: Celino Bleiweiß

 1983 to 1985: Mein lieber Onkel Hans, literary base, director:

References

Further reading 
 : Eberhard Panitz. In: Erik Simon,  (eds.): Die Science-fiction der DDR. Autoren und Werke. Ein Lexikon. Verlag Das Neue Berlin, Berlin 1988, pp. 212ff

External links 

 
 
 

1932 births
2021 deaths
East German writers
Writers from Dresden
Socialist realism writers
German male novelists
German non-fiction writers
German radio writers
20th-century German screenwriters
German male screenwriters
German editors
Literary editors
Writers from Berlin
Recipients of the Patriotic Order of Merit